The 2018–19 Second League was the 64th season of the Second League, the second tier of the Bulgarian football league system, and the 3rd season under this name and current league structure. In June 2018, the Executive Committee of the Bulgarian Football Union decided to increase the participating teams to 18 for the 2019–20 season; as a result, only two teams will be relegated to Third League. The fixture list was released on 8 June 2018. The participating teams were confirmed on the same day. FC Tsarsko Selo Sofia became champions of the second league and were promoted directly to the first division. FC Dobrudzha Dobrich and PFC Nesebar were relegated.

Teams
The following teams have changed division since the 2017–18 season.

To Second League 
Promoted from Third League
 Dobrudzha Dobrich
 Arda
 Kariana
 CSKA 1948

Relegated from First League
 Pirin Blagoevgrad

From Second League 
Relegated to Third League
 Neftochimic
 Sozopol
 Maritsa Plovdiv
 Oborishte

Promoted to First League
 Botev Vratsa

Stadia and locations

Personnel and sponsorship
Note: Flags indicate national team as has been defined under FIFA eligibility rules. Players and managers may hold more than one non-FIFA nationality.

Note: Individual clubs may wear jerseys with advertising. However, only one sponsorship is permitted per jersey for official tournaments organised by UEFA in addition to that of the kit manufacturer (exceptions are made for non-profit organisations).
Clubs in the domestic league can have more than one sponsorship per jersey which can feature on the front of the shirt, incorporated with the main sponsor or in place of it; or on the back, either below the squad number or on the collar area. Shorts also have space available for advertisement.

Managerial changes

League table

Results

Positions by round

Top scorers

References 

2018-19
Bul
2